Into Great Silence is a 2005 documentary film directed by Philip Gröning. An international co-production between France, Switzerland and Germany, it is an intimate portrayal of the everyday lives of Carthusian monks of the Grande Chartreuse, a monastery high in the French Alps (Chartreuse Mountains).

Production
Gröning proposed the idea for the film to the monks in 1984, but the Carthusians said they wanted time to think about it. They responded to him 16 years later to say they were willing to permit him to shoot the movie if he was still interested. Gröning then came alone to live at the monastery, and to stay in the enclosure, where except for the order's aspirants no visitors are allowed, for a total of six months in 2002 and 2003. He filmed and recorded on his own, using no artificial light.

Afterwards, he spent two and a half years editing the film. The final cut contains neither spoken commentary nor added sound effects. It consists of images and sounds that depict the rhythm of monastic life, with occasional intertitles displaying selections from Holy Scripture.

Reception
The film has experienced a generally laudatory reception, with 89% of critics on Rotten Tomatoes responding with positive reviews in the T-metric section and a "certified fresh" rating. United States Conference of Catholic Bishops' Office for Film and Broadcasting listed Into Great Silence as one of the best ten films of 2007. The Carthusian monks themselves loved the film.

Awards
 Special Jury Prize at the 2006 Sundance Festival.
 European Film Awards 2006, Documentary - Prix Arte
 Bavarian Film Award best documentary film, 2006
 Film Award of the German Association of Film Critics, best documentary film, 2006
 Film Award of the German Film Critics, best documentary film, 2006
 Film Award German Camera, best camera in a documentary film, 2006
 Jury Film Award for the best documentary film in the international festival contest of São Paulo/Rio de Janeiro
 International Ennio Flaiano Award of Pescara in Italy for best camera and best film

See also
Hermit
Monasticism
Camaldoli
Desert Fathers

References

External links
 
 
 Official web page
 Slant Magazine Film Review by Keith Uhlich
 U.S. distributor: Zeitgeist films - includes 12 page press kit, downloadable

2005 films
Sundance Film Festival award winners
European Film Awards winners (films)
Films about Catholicism
Documentary films about Christianity
Documentary films about spirituality
Carthusian Order
French documentary films
Swiss documentary films
German documentary films
2005 documentary films
2000s French films
2000s German films